was a Japanese film director and screenwriter.

Biography
After graduating from Tokyo Imperial University in 1936, Nakamura joined the Shochiku film studios, working as an assistant director for Torajirō Saitō and Yasujirō Shimazu. He debuted as director in 1941 with Life and Rhythm, and finally received recognition with his 1951 film Home Sweet Home. His most noted works include the Yasunari Kawabata adaptation Twin Sisters of Kyoto (1963), The Kii River (1966) and Portrait of Chieko (1968). Both Twin Sisters of Kyoto and Portrait of Chieko were nominated for the Academy Award for Best Foreign Language Film His 1967 film Lost Spring was entered into the 17th Berlin International Film Festival.

Legacy
To celebrate Nakamura's 100th birthday, three of his films, Home Sweet Home (1951), When It Rains, It Pours (1957) and The Shape of Night (1964), were screened at the Tokyo Filmex in 2013.

Filmography (selected)
 Life and Rhythm (1941)
 The Ideals of Marriage (1941)
 Otoko no iki (1942)
 Omitsu no endan (1946)
 Home Sweet Home (1951)
 Nami (1951)
 Adventure of Natsuko (1953)
 Shuzenji Monagatari (1955)
 Doshaburi (1957)
 The Country Boss (1958)
 Waiting for Spring (1959)
 Marry a Millionaire (1959)
 I-Ro-Ha-Ni-Ho-He-To (1960)
 Twin Sisters of Kyoto (1963)
 The Shape of Night (1964)
 Niju issai no chichi (1964)
 The Kii River (1966)
 Lost Spring (1967)
 Chieko-sho (1967)
 Portrait of Chieko (1968)
 Waga Toso  (1968)
 Through Days and Months (1969)
 Waga Ko, Waga Uta (1969)
 The Song from My Heart (1970)
 Kaze no Bojô (1970)
 Shiroi Shojo (1976)
 Shiokari Pass (1977)
 Nichiren (1979)

References

External links
 
 

1913 births
1981 deaths
Japanese film directors
People from Tokyo